Peter Davies is a South African television presenter, journalist, and author. From 1996 to 2007, he anchored hundreds of sporting events, including three Cricket World Cups and two FIFA World Cups.

On 6 October 2011, Davies appeared at the Johannesburg Magistrate's Court on a charge of lewd conduct, but charges were dropped after being settled out of court.

References

Year of birth missing (living people)
Living people
South African television presenters
South African sports journalists